West Charleston is an unincorporated village in the town of Charleston, Orleans County, Vermont, United States. West Charleston has a post office with ZIP code 05872.

References

Unincorporated communities in Orleans County, Vermont
Unincorporated communities in Vermont